Allahabad Public Library, also known as Thornhill Mayne Memorial, is a public library situated at Chandrashekhar Azad Park in Allahabad (Prayagraj). Established in 1864, it is the biggest library in the state of Uttar Pradesh. The building was designed by Richard Roskell Bayne and is considered a remarkable example of Scottish Baronial Revival architecture. The monument has served as the house of legislative assembly in British era when Allahabad was the capital of United Provinces. In 1879, the Public library was shifted to the present premises at  Chandrashekhar Azad Park.

Holdings
The library has an approximate collection of 125,000 books, 40 types of magazines and 28 different newspapers in Hindi, English, Urdu and Bangla and contains 21 Arabic manuscripts. It also has a collection of old government publications, parliamentary papers, and blue books of the 19th century, old manuscripts and journals.

Building
The building known as Thornhill Mayne Memorial is situated at Alfred Park and was designed by Richard Roskell Bayne in Scottish Baronial architecture with sharp pillars and turrets of granite and sandstone. It represents structural polychromy with lofty towers and arcaded cloisters. When completed in 1870, the building cost approx. INR 94,222. It was funded by Commissioner of Allahabad, Mr. Mayne and was opened as a memorial to Cuthbert Bensley Thornhill.

See also
 List of tourist attractions in Allahabad
 List of libraries in India

References

Public libraries in India
Buildings and structures in Allahabad
Libraries in Uttar Pradesh
Tourist attractions in Allahabad
Library buildings completed in 1870
1870 establishments in India